Qareh Bolagh-e Azam (also Romanized as Qareh Bolāgh-e A‘z̧am and Qarah Bolāgh-e A‘z̧am) is a village in Howmeh-ye Sarpol Rural District, in the Central District of Sarpol-e Zahab County, Kermanshah Province, Iran. At the 2006 census, its population was 435, in 96 families.

References 

Populated places in Sarpol-e Zahab County